Tallvik is a locality situated in Överkalix Municipality, Norrbotten County, Sweden with 434 inhabitants in 2010.

References 

Populated places in Överkalix Municipality
Norrbotten